The Spinks Akromaster is an aerobatic aircraft that was designed by Charlie Hillard.

Design and development
"Pappy" Spinks provided the funding and name to Charlie Hillard for the creation of the Akromaster.

The Akromaster is a single-seat, low-wing, monoplane with conventional landing gear and a symmetrical airfoil. It features inverted fuel and oil systems and an air show smoke system.

Operational history
During certification testing of the cabin version of the Akromaster, aerobatic pilot Harold Krier was unable to recover from a flat spin and died due to a parachute malfunction.

Charlie Hillard flew the Akromaster prior to forming the Red Devils aerobatic team. Hillard placed third in the 1970 world aerobatic championships with the aircraft.

Specifications (Akromaster)

References

External links
Charlie Hillard at the Air Show Hall of Fame
Images of the Akromaster

Aerobatic aircraft